Yarner Wood & Trendlebere Down in Dartmoor, Devon, England is a woodland managed by Natural England. The woodland is part of the East Dartmoor Woods and Heaths National Nature Reserve. Since 1985 the site has been designated a Site of Special Scientific Interest. Many types of tree grow in Yarner Wood including oak, birch, scots pine, larch and beech. It is home to buzzards, sparrow hawks, nightjars and pied flycatchers.

From 1857 to 1862, a copper mine operated in Yarner Wood and extracted ore which gave over 2000 tonnes of copper.

See also
List of Sites of Special Scientific Interest in Devon
National nature reserves in England

References

External links 
 East Dartmoor Woods and Heaths

Dartmoor
Sites of Special Scientific Interest in Devon
Woodland Sites of Special Scientific Interest
Forests and woodlands of Devon
National nature reserves in England